Mark John Lexer Galedo (born September 11, 1985) is a Filipino professional road bicycle racer, who currently rides for UCI Continental team .

Galedo was inspired to take up cycling after he watched Victor Espiritu finish as the 1996 Marlboro Tour (now the Tour de Filipinas) champion.

Personal life
Galedo formerly had Guevarra as his last name but discontinued using it in competitions after his father abandoned their family. 

Associated with Caloocan, Galedo is a former car-painter and kitchen helper. He also runs a bicycle shop in Mandaluyong with his wife.

Major results
Source: 

2009
 1st  Overall Tour of Luzon
2011
 Southeast Asian Games
2nd  Road race
3rd  Time trial
3rd  Team time trial
2012
 1st Overall Ronda Pilipinas
 6th Overall Tour de Filipinas
 10th Overall Tour of Vietnam
2013
 Southeast Asian Games
1st  Time trial
3rd  Team road race
 7th Overall Tour de Filipinas
 9th Overall Jelajah Malaysia
 10th Overall Tour of Borneo
2014
 1st  Overall Tour de Filipinas
1st Stage 2
2015
 National Road Championships
2nd Road race
2nd Time trial
 2nd Overall Tour de Filipinas
 3rd Overall Tour of Borneo
 6th Time trial, Southeast Asian Games
2016
 4th Overall Jelajah Malaysia
2018
 1st Time trial, National Road Championships
 6th Overall Tour de Filipinas
2019
 6th Time trial, Southeast Asian Games
2022
 1st Time trial, National Road Championships
 10th Time trial, Southeast Asian Games

References

External links

Filipino male cyclists
Living people
1985 births
People from Caloocan
Cyclists at the 2014 Asian Games
Southeast Asian Games medalists in cycling
Southeast Asian Games gold medalists for the Philippines
Southeast Asian Games silver medalists for the Philippines
Southeast Asian Games bronze medalists for the Philippines
Competitors at the 2011 Southeast Asian Games
Competitors at the 2013 Southeast Asian Games
Competitors at the 2015 Southeast Asian Games
Competitors at the 2019 Southeast Asian Games
Competitors at the 2021 Southeast Asian Games
Asian Games competitors for the Philippines